Jeevaraj Alva (1947–2001) was an Indian politician and a minister in the government of Karnataka.

Career
Alva was minister in the Government of Karnataka and Vice President of Janata Dal (United).

Jeevaraj Alva was a trained physician from St. John's Medical College. In college he became a student leader during the JP movement and this led him to decide against practicing as a doctor. He was one of the close associates of Ramakrishna Hegde. He became Secretary general of Janata Party state Unit during (1988–90). He joined Bharatiya Janata Party just before 1994 Karnataka Legislative Assembly elections. Later he was also the state unit president of Lok Shakti in 1999.

Personal life
Alva was born into a middle-class family which hailed from the coastal Canara region of Karnataka and belonged to the Tulu speaking Bunt community. His father, K. Nagappa Alva, was also a politician and he once headed the state unit of the Congress party.

Alva married the classical dancer Nandini Alva (née Seth). They are the parents of a son, Aditya (b. 1989) who is an active BJP leader in Benguluru, and a daughter, Priyanka (b. 1983). On 29 October 2010, Priyanka married the Hindi film actor Vivek Oberoi. The couple have a son, Vivaan (born 6 February 2013) and a daughter, Ameyaa (born 21 April 2015).

Alva died on 12 February 2001 at Manipal Hospital, Bangalore. He was 53 years old, and was survived by his wife and two young children, aged 12 and 18.

References

2001 deaths
State cabinet ministers of Karnataka
1947 births
Janata Dal (United) politicians
Bharatiya Janata Party politicians from Karnataka
Lok Shakti politicians
Janata Dal politicians
Janata Party politicians